The Odeon Hill is an area located to the north-east of the archaeological site of Carthage in Tunisia. This hill is the site of numerous Roman relics, including those of the theatre and the odeon. The park of the Roman villas is located in its extension and allows the visitor to stroll in a district of the ancient city which is largely open. The park includes in particular the villa of the aviary, the best preserved Roman villa of the site of Carthage, and a very beautiful mosaic discovered near the pillard monument, the mosaic of the horses, was moved there.

Topography and location 

The Odeon Hill has its name due to a misidentification of the theatre which was meant it was the Odeon, known to exist from Tertullian, but what tuned out to be a theatre. Odeon hill and the park of the Roman villas are located to the east of the Roman colony of Carthage, and to the north of the park of the Baths of Antoninus. On its outskirts is now located the area of the presidential palace in the south, while in the north the Mâlik ibn Anas mosque has been built.

Historical background 

Although the area is outside the boundaries of the Punic city of Qart Hadasht, which was destroyed in 146 BC, pre-Roman relics have been found on the site during various excavations. Important relics are also mentioned by various sources, in particular an extract from Tertullian's Traité de la résurrection de la chair which mentions Punic burial sites. Some of these burial sites have been dated to the third century BC.

The great fire of the second century, which swept through the capital of the governor of the province, made it possible to develop this hilly area as part of an important urban planning project. A vast district of luxurious dwellings, including the "Villa de la volière", was built on this occasion. A circular monument, which was excavated during the UNESCO campaign, called "rotonde sur podium carré", is sometimes dated to the Christian period and identified by some researchers as a mausoleum. A huge inscription to Aesculapius was also found nearby, which suggests that the Punic temple of Eshmun was located on this site. Texts indicate that the Romans built the temple to the corresponding deity of their pantheon on the same site. The last fundamental element of the building program is a large leisure area, with a theater dating from the second century and an odeon built in the third century.

According to Victor de Vita, the whole area was destroyed by the Vandals. However, a remaining population lived there and a settlement persisted in the ruins.

The area was rediscovered at the end of the 19th century. The Odeon was excavated in 1900-1901, and the theater was excavated in 1904.

Public buildings 
The two main leisure elements, both of which face each other, were built on different principles.

The theater is a mixture of Greek and Roman theater: the tiers are supported by a system of vaults, but take advantage of the slope of the hill. The cavea consisted of sections with tiers separated by stairs. The orchestra, with its more comfortable movable seats, was intended for VIP spectators. The pulpitum was a wall separating the orchestra from the stage, while the frons scænae formed the backdrop to the building. The odeon was entirely built, as it did not take advantage of the topography.

These principles are difficult to grasp because of the extent of the destruction, no doubt linked to the luxury of the materials used.

Theatre 

Tertullian mentions in his introduction to the Florides the richness of the decoration, the splendor of the marbles of the cavea, the parquet floor of the proscenium and the haughty beauty of the pillars. There was a colonnade of marble and porphyry on the frons scænae, numerous statues and quality epigraphic ornaments. The theatre extends over an area equivalent of about four blocks and dates probably to the times of Augustus. By size it is the second largest Roman theatre in Africa, only the one in Utica is larger.  

Fragments of inscriptions found in the theater refer to repairs made in the fourth century.

There are very few Roman remains of the stands in the present building. The theatre was renovated and since 1964 it is the site of the International Festival of Carthage. The semicircular walls also date from the early 20th century when it was used for costume production.

The place is also marked by contemporary history: Winston Churchill gave a speech to his armies during the Second World War. The theater was restored more recently in 1967 to accommodate the International Festival of Carthage.

Odeon 

For the Odeon, the current situation is even worse than for the theater: only traces of substructures remain, barely cleared at the beginning of the 20th century. It was rediscovered by  who lead the excavations between 1900 and 1901. The Odeon was mentioned by the christian theologist Tertullian and is where the Roman Emperor of African origin Septimus Severus shall have awarded the prize for the winner of the literary competition. The Odeon, which is considered to be the largest Roman Odeon, lies adjacent to the southern theatre and occupies three city blocks. It had a seating capacity of about 20'000 spectators and it was not assumed to be an Odeon were it not for the inscription ODEVM discovered in a cistern under the stage. In comparison, the second largest roman Odeon in Athens had a seating capacity of 5'000.

Excavations took place again between 1994-2000 by researchers from the School of Architecture of the University of Waterloo in Ontario and the Trinity University in Texas. Although the site is located in a non aedificandi zone, it is now situated in the immediate vicinity of the Mâlik ibn Anas Mosque. The building, which stood against the theater and was built entirely above ground level, had semicircular corridors for the circulation of visitors. Tertullian mentions the discovery of burial sites during the construction of the building. Timothy Barnes assumed it to have been built around 200 BC.

Ornament 

The ancient texts from Tertullian, but also Apuleius allow us to imagine the ornamentation of the two public leisure buildings.

However, pieces of marble were found in the cisterns under the odeon.

Marbles used 
The odeon was decorated with pink and green marble, the columns ending in Corinthian tents.

Artworks 
Numerous works of art decorated the buildings, some of which were found during the excavations. In the theater, the numerous statues of divinities or characters found were deposited in the Bardo National Museum, including the famous Apollon du théâtre.

The stage wall of the odeon had niches which must also have been decorated with sculptures.

Roman villas 

The relics of the villas are in a mediocre state, except for those of the villa of the aviary. The main interest of the district consists in the vision of a neighbourhood of the Colonia Iulia Carthago, organised in insulae or small islands of 35 meters by 141 meters.

General characteristics 
The second-century district has orthogonal streets, "successive tiers crammed into the sides of the hill"; the upper tier is located in the ground, the lower tier opens onto the street above the lower tier. The flats were located on the upper floor, with the shops occupying the ground floor at street level.

Villa of the aviary 

The villa is the main feature of the park, due to the quality of the restoration carried out in the 1960s. The name of the villa comes from the mosaic of the aviary, marked by the presence of birds among the foliage, which occupies the garden, in the center of the viridarium, the heart of a square courtyard framed by a portico decorated with pink marble pillars.

To the southwest is a terrace that opens onto the street. To the west, a vaulted gallery also serves as a relief from the pressure of the ground, while the building's atrium is located to the east. To the north are all the prestige rooms, the ceremonial flats, the laraire and the vestibule.

Upstairs were the baths and shops. On the upper floor were the private flats of the owners, with shops under the terraced portico. Below the cryptoporticus was a weatherproof promenade.

See also 

 Archeological site of Carthage
 History of Carthage
 Ancient Roman architecture
 International Festival of Carthage

References

Bibliography 

 
 
 
 
 
 
 
 
 
Roman theatres
Ancient Rome